Airbike may refer to 
 EADS Airbike, nylon bicycle
 ISON Airbike, ultralight aircraft